Zhigalovo is an urban locality (a work settlement) and the administrative center of Zhigalovsky District of Irkutsk Oblast, Russia. Population:

Geography
The settlement is located in the Lena-Angara Plateau, on the left bank of the Lena River at its confluence with the Tutura.

Transportation
Zhigalovo is served by the Zhigalovo Airport.

Climate
Zhigalovo has a monsoonal subarctic climate (Köppen climate classification Dwc) with severely cold winters and warm summers. Precipitation is quite low, but is much higher in summer than at other times of the year.

References

Urban-type settlements in Irkutsk Oblast
Populated places on the Lena River
Zhigalovsky District